"It's Not Love (But It's Not Bad)" is a song written by Hank Cochran and Glenn Martin, and recorded by American country music artist Merle Haggard and The Strangers.  It was released in August 1972 as the first single and title track from the album It's Not Love (But It's Not Bad).  The song was Haggard and The Strangers thirteenth number one on the country chart.  The single hit number one for one week and spent a total of twelve weeks on the country chart.

Personnel
Merle Haggard– vocals, guitar

The Strangers:
Roy Nichols – lead guitar
Norman Hamlet – steel guitar, dobro
Bobby Wayne - rhythm guitar, harmony vocals
Dennis Hromek – bass, background vocals
Biff Adam – drums

Chart performance

References

1972 singles
1972 songs
Merle Haggard songs
Songs written by Hank Cochran
Song recordings produced by Ken Nelson (American record producer)
Capitol Records singles